The 1966–67 Algerian Championnat National was the fifth season of the Algerian Championnat National since its establishment in 1962. A total of 16 teams contested the league, with CR Belcourt as the defending champions.

Team summaries

Promotion and relegation 
Teams promoted from Algerian Division 2 1966-1967 
 USM Bel-Abbès
 JSM Skikda

Teams relegated to Algerian Division 2 1967-1968
 USM Blida
 SCM Oran

League table

References

External links
1966–67 Algerian Championnat National

Algerian Ligue Professionnelle 1 seasons
1966–67 in Algerian football
Algeria